The 1910–11 team finished with a record of 4–8. It was the 2nd and last year for head coach Clare Hunt. The school yearbook list W.P. Bowmen as the head coach. The team captain was Oda A. Hindelang.

Roster

Schedule

|-
!colspan=9 style="background:#006633; color:#FFFFFF;"| Non-conference regular season

1. EMU media guide list score of 20-52 and yearbook list score of 24-52.

2. EMU media guide list score of 32-71 and yearbook list score of 32-68.

3. EMU media guide list score of 38-20 and yearbook list score of 36-32.

4. EMU has the date of 3/2, Olivet has the date of 3/3 and the EMU yearbook has the date of 3/4.

5. EMU media guide list date of 3/11 and yearbook list date of 3/12.

References

Eastern Michigan Eagles men's basketball seasons
Michigan State Normal